Michel André may refer to:

 Michel André (bobsleigh) (born 1970), French bobsledder
 Michel André (mathematician) (1936–2009), Swiss mathematician
 Michel André (actor)